Labastide-du-Temple is a commune in the Tarn-et-Garonne department in the Occitania region in Southern France. In 2019, it had a population of 1,143.

See also
Communes of the Tarn-et-Garonne department

References

Communes of Tarn-et-Garonne